Clayoquot Arm Provincial Park is a provincial park in British Columbia, Canada.

See also
Clayoquot Plateau Provincial Park
Clayoquot Sound

References

Provincial parks of British Columbia
Clayoquot Sound region
1995 establishments in British Columbia